Jakson Da Trindade (born 13 June 1994), commonly known as Capito, is a São Toméan footballer who plays as a forward for Sporting Praia Cruz and the São Tomé and Príncipe national team.

International career
Capito made his international debut for São Tomé and Príncipe on 4 September 2019.

References

External links

1994 births
Living people
Association football forwards
São Tomé and Príncipe footballers
São Tomé and Príncipe international footballers
Sporting Praia Cruz players